IDOC can refer to:
Idaho Department of Correction
Illinois Department of Corrections
Indiana Department of Correction
Institutional Documentation Service, part of the College Board's CSS Profile
IDoc, a data exchange format.